Harun-Ur-Rashid Askari (born 1 June 1965), known as Rashid Askari, is a Bengali-English writer, fictionist, columnist, translator, media personality, and an academic in Bangladesh. He was the 12th vice-chancellor of Islamic University, Bangladesh in Kushtia. Among post-1990s Bangladeshi writers, he is easily on par with the major ones who gained identical and impressive mastery over both Bangla and English.

Early life and education
Askari was born in Askarpur, Mithapukur, Rangpur in erstwhile East Pakistan (now Bangladesh) in 1965 to M. A. Mannan, an English teacher and headmaster, and Setara Begum, a housewife. Rashid passed the secondary school and higher secondary certificate examinations in 1980 and 1982. He "obtained Honours and Master's degrees in English from Dhaka University with distinction, and a PhD in Indian English Literature from the University of Poona".

Career
Askari joined Islamic University, Kushtia as a lecturer in English in 1990. He became a professor in 2005 and was head of the English department more than once. Currently, he is the dean of the Faculty of Arts. He served with King Khalid University - the Kingdom of Saudi Arabia as a professor of English for five years (2008-2013). Askari later became a writer. His "debut as a writer was marked in 1996 by his book The Dying Homeland. Until recently, he has authored seven books and edited three volumes of English Writings of Rabindranath Tagore (2012-2013) published in commemoration of the 150th birth anniversary of the poet. He has also written a large number of articles, essays and newspaper columns on a great variety of themes ranging from national to international and colonial to postcolonial, which have been published at home and abroad". He is the editor of Bangladesh's first multilingual international literary magazine—The Archer. He was elected the Secretary General of Federation of Bangladesh University Teachers' Association for 2014. He was "made new chairman of folklore studies department of the Islamic University in Kushtia". Askari has been nominated as a part-time member of the University Grants Commission of Bangladesh (UGC). He is working as a member of "the international publication and translation sub-committee" under "Bangabandhu's Birth Centenary Celebration National Implementation Committee"  and translated Sheikh Mujib's 10 January speech delivered at the Race Course into English. He also translated in English Sheikh Mujib's UN speech on 25 September 1974.

He is a peer reviewer and a Quality Assurance (QA) expert nominated by the Quality Assurance Unit of the Government of Bangladesh. "Askari regularly writes columns in various newspapers". "The areas of his academic interest include Modern and Postmodern Fiction, Colonial and Postcolonial Literatures, South-Asian Writing in English, Literary Theories and Creative Writing". In the recent past "Askari has been accorded gold medal for his contribution to advancement of education sector" in Bangladesh. He has also received "Janonetri Sheikh Hasina Award 2019" for his outstanding contribution to education sector,  and "won the Dhaka University Alumni News Award 2020".

Writing style

Askari had a flair for creative writing since his school days. An unsigned profile in The Kushtia Times stated that Askari writes "both Bengali and English with equal ease and efficiency". Bangladeshi novelist and critic Syed Manzoorul Islam notes:

Askari has demonstrated enough artistic talent to come up with fiction in English, which must be a source of inspiration for many of us". In his short story collection Nineteen Seventy One and Other Stories(2011) "Rashid Askari speaks of a long-ago war, revisiting the age of brutality we emerged free of through beating back the denizens of darkness". "The book contains a dozen of mind-blowing stories mostly based on realistic events that took place either in faraway villages or the bustling metropolis in Bangladesh. However, the regional fictional representation does not evade universal significance." The book has been translated into French Language and also into Hindi". His short story "Virus" was published in the Daily Sun's Eid Special 2017 and "A slice of sky" has been published in the Contemporary Literary Review India (CLRI), a peer-reviewed , internationally refereed and high impact factor journal. Askari wrote the intellectual biography of the country's founding president Bangabandhu Sheikh Mujibur Rahman,  which is "based on authentic background information, factual accounts of events, historical research and clear elegant prose". He edited the English version of Bangladesh Prime Minister Sheikh Hasina’s book My Father, My Bangladesh published in Amar Ekushey Book Fair 2021. "Sharp and minute detailed description of human behaviour, and pictorial presentation of events and settings in his carefully chosen words demonstrate Rashid Askari's mastery in story writing/telling," says the President of the International Consortium for Social Development and Professor of Social Work at Charles Sturt University, NSW, Australia, Manohar Pawar. "There is a postcolonial undertone in the author’s approach by way of debunking the ugly face of the petty-colonial power in the saddle after 1947". "Like most postcolonial writers, his choice of English makes him at once an insider and an outsider – a member of the social elite, who writes about the subaltern." Askari's "sensible uses of stylistics can make it pure theory or theory equal."

Bibliography

Books 
 Mumūrṣu shadēśa (The Dying Homeland), 1996
 Indō-inrēji sāhitya ō an'yān'ya (Indo-English Literature and Others), 1996 
 Ēkālēra rūpakathā (Today's Folktale), 1997 
 Binirmita bhābanā (Deconstructing Thoughts), 2001 
 Uttarādhunika sāhitya ō samālōcanā tattba (Postmodern Literary and Critical Theory), 2002 
 The Wounded Land: Peoples, Politics, Culture, Literature, Liberation War, War Crimes, and Militancy in Bangladesh, 2010 
 Nineteen seventy one and other stories: a collection of short stories, 2011
 English Writings of Tagore(3 volumes), 2012–13
 The Making of Mujib: an intellectual biography, Dhaka: 2022, Bangla Academy
 Bangladesh: Somokalin Somaj, Rajniti (Bangladesh: Contemporary Society-Politics) Dhaka: 2019
 Bangabandhu, Sheikh Hasina: Somokalin Bangladesh (Bangabandhu, Sheikh Hasina: Contemporary Bangladesh), Dhaka: 2022

Short stories 
 Lottery, 2011 
 Nineteen seventy one, 2011 
 Jihad, 2012
 Locked-in Syndrome, 2012 
 Virus, 2017 
 The Disclosure, 2019 - This was published in the emerging and seasoned writers publishing platform Kitaab'
 The virgin whore, 2019 - The virgin whore" was published in  the New York City and India based magazine Cafe Dissensus.
 A slice of sky, 2019

Articles 
 

 —— ( January 2012). "Tipaimukh Dam and Indian Hydropolitics".

 
 
 
 
 
—— ( October 2015). "A Brief history of Bangladeshi writing in English".
—— ( January 2020). "Psychological Abuse against Women and Judicial Relief in the Context of the Subcontinent"

Newspaper columns 

 -- (14 Dec 2007). ''Intellectual killing and the war crimes of 1971''
  (August 15, 2007). Mujib and the Declaration of Independence
 -- (15 Aug 2010). ''The founder of Bangladesh''-- (16 Dec , 2010). Liberation War facts -- (17 Sep 2011). Tagore poetry in English. -- (11 Jan 2015). The crowded planet and the fate of mankind -- (21 June 2015). ''Bangladesh and the blue economy''-- (28 Feb, 2018). "Bangla Should Be a UN Language". -- (13 Feb, 2018). "Valentine's Day and an Anatomy of Love".-- (3 Nov, 2018). "Dhaka Translation Fest: A Window on the World".-- (24 Oct, 2018). "Rabindranath, Bangladesh and the Bangalee Diaspora" -- (10 May 2018). "Tagore And Bangladesh" -- (28 Apr, 2018). "Poet Belal Chowdhury: Our Grand Old Man of Poesy"-- (9 Nov, 2018). The birth of Dhaka Translation Fest (DTF) -- (10 Jan, 2020). "We don't know defeat" -- (3 Nov, 2019). "Establishing Int'l Publication and Translation Institute is a matter of urgency" -- (24 Oct, 2019). "Bangladesh and the Uncrowned Queen of Development" -- (22 Sep, 2019). "7th ICSDAP Conference on Social Unrest, Peace and Development"-- (7 Mar 2020). ''Bangabandhu's 7 March Speech: The Power of Spoken Word''-- (30 Mar, 2020). "Life in the Time of Corona"-- (31 Mar, 2020). "Corona-phobia: Times of Stress and Angst"-- (05 Apr, 2020). ''The plague of COVID-19''-- (25 Sep 2020). The essential Vidyasagar: (On his 200th birth anniversary)-- (18 Oct, 2020). A flower born to blush unseen-- (31 May 2019). Dialogue of Asian civilizations: Uniting Asia and beyond-- (23 August 2015).Why write fiction in English

Book review
 "The Story of an Inspirational Figure"- a review by Askari of the biography of Bangabandhu Sheikh Mujibur Rahman by Syed Badrul Ahsan published by the Embassy of Bangladesh, Washington D.C. News on 15 Jan 2014.
 A review of his book "Nineteen Seventy One" published by Rubric Publishing, New Delhi, India in 2019  has been published in the March–April 2019 edition of Indian Literature published by Sahitya Akademi, India.
A review of the book "Nineteen Seventy One" published by the International Journal of Community and Social Development, written by Manohar Pawar, Professor of Social Work at Charles Sturt University, NSW, Australia, and the President of the International Consortium for Social Development.
A review of the book--The Making of Mujib (2022) has been published in the Daily Star on June 9, 2022.

Awards
Askari has been awarded the Oitijjo Gold Medal 2019 by Bangladesh Folklore Research Centre of Rajshahi University for his contribution to the fields of literature and education.
 He has also received "Janonetri Sheikh Hasina Award 2019" for his outstanding contribution to education sector.
Rashid Askari won the Dhaka University Alumni News Award 2020

References

External links 
 

1965 births
Living people
Bangladeshi male writers
University of Dhaka alumni
Savitribai Phule Pune University alumni
Academic staff of the Islamic University, Bangladesh
Vice-Chancellors of the Islamic University, Bangladesh
People from Rangpur District
Academic staff of King Khalid University